Sand Creek is a stream noted for the "most spectacular examples of cross-bedded sandstone and topple blocks in North America". Sand Creek flows from the Laramie Mountains in Larimer County, Colorado into Albany County, Wyoming where it joins the Laramie River.

The area where Sand Creek crosses the border between Colorado and Wyoming was designated a National Natural Landmark in 1984.

See also 
 List of National Natural Landmarks
 List of rivers of Colorado
 List of rivers of Wyoming

References

External links

Geology of Wyoming
National Natural Landmarks in Wyoming
National Natural Landmarks in Colorado
Rivers of Colorado
Tributaries of the Platte River
Rivers of Larimer County, Colorado
Rivers of Albany County, Wyoming